W is a women's beauty magazine published by Condé Nast Publications. A famous person, usually an actress, singer, or model, is featured on the cover of each month's issue. Following are the names of each cover subject from the most recent issue to the first issue of W under editorship of Patrick McCarthy in August 1993. Sara Moonves is the current editor in chief of W, having been promoted in 2019. Since 2013, the magazine will combine the January/December and June/July issues so as to free up money to invest in the magazine's digital brand.

1993

1994

1995

1996

1997

1998

1999

2000

2001

2002

2003

2004

2005

2006

2007

2008

2009

2010

2011

2012

2013

2014

2015

2016

2017

2018

2019

2020

2021

2022

References

External links
http://www.fashion-iconography.net
http://www.wmagazine.com

W
W
Magazines published in the United States